The Michaab was an early medical device, invented by Al-Zahrawi, a form of lithotrite which was minimally-invasive. He was able to crush the stone inside the bladder without the need for a surgical incision. It was later modified by Jean Civiale, and was used to perform transurethral lithotripsy, the first known minimally invasive surgery, to crush stones inside the bladder without having to open the abdomen (lithotomy). To remove a calculus the instrument was inserted  through the urethra and holes bored in the stone. Afterwards, it was  crushed  with the same instrument and resulting fragments  aspirated or allowed to flow normally with urine.

References

Medical equipment
Urologic procedures